Angelo Emo (3 January 1731 – 1 March 1792) was a Venetian noble and admiral, mostly known for being the last admiral of the Republic of Venice to lead the Venetian navy to battle. Distinguished for his seamanship since early in his career, he introduced reforms based on the practices of the British Royal Navy, and led raids on the harbours of the Beylik of Tunis in retaliation for corsair attacks on Venetian-flagged shipping.

Biography

Early life and career
Angelo Emo was born in Venice on 3 January 1731, at the Palazzo Emo, in the parish of San Simeone Piccolo. he hailed from  a distinguished aristocratic family. His father, Giovanni di Gabriele, had reached the position of Procurator of Saint Mark, the highest distinction for a Venetian citizen below that of Doge of Venice. His mother was Lucia Lombardo. Of mediocre stature, slight build and pale complexion, Emo stood out for his wide forehead, thick eyebrow, and large eyes. Historical accounts portray him in later life as a difficult, stubborn and haughty character. Angelo Emo was educated at the Jesuit college in Brescia, before returning to Venice, where which his father chose as his tutors the scholars , Jacopo Stellini, and Carlo Lodoli. The beneficiary of an excellent humanistic education, the young Emo was an ardent student of Venetian history, whose ancient glories he sought to emulate, as well as the ancient Roman historian Tacitus, who became his favourite author.

In the same year, he went on his first sea voyage, escorting the Venetian trade convoy to Smyrna. Emo proved a quick learner in naval matters, and already his first commander remarked on his promise as a naval officer. Within two years he had been promoted to captain of a first-rate 74-gun ship of the line, the Sant'Ignazio. In this command, Emo tested a new mast configuration by emulating English models, and distinguished himself in escort duties of the trade convoys to Smyrna, repelling the attacks of pirates. He then commanded the second-rate Speranza.

Voyage of the San Carlo
At the time, the Venetian maritime trade, that had once dominated the Mediterranean, was in decline. The wealthy patricians preferred reliable investments in their estates in the Terraferma to the hazards of the sea, the emergence of new commercial centres such as Livorno and Trieste siphoned traffic off from Venice, attacks by the Barbary pirates were a constant threat, and the Genoese, Dutch, and English merchants had come to dominate the westward routes into the Atlantic. Attacks by the Barbary pirates of the Ottoman-aligned principalities of Algiers and Tunis, as well as raids by the smaller pirate towns of Bar (Antivari) and Ulcinj (Dulcigno) were also a constant threat. The main task of the Venetian fleet, based at Corfu, was to safeguard Venetian shipping against such attacks. The interruption caused by the War of the Austrian Succession, however, had allowed the Venetian government, which remained neutral, the opportunity to try and seize back a share of trade with the Atlantic ports of Western Europe, equipping new and better ships and providing subsidies to merchants. Venetian successes proved ephemeral, as the end of the war in 1748 had allowed the English and Dutch traders to resume their voyages, but for some time the Venetian government continued to attempt to revive its Atlantic trade.

As part of these attempts, in 1758 Emo was charged to lead an expedition to cover the return of six Venetian merchantmen from London, and protect them from Barbary pirate attacks. He was given a squadron of three ships, comprising the first-rate , the second-rate (large frigate) San Vicenzo, and the frigate Costanza. Emo's squadron left Corfu on 27 September 1658. Three days later, it reached Malta, where it gathered intelligence on the Barbary pirates, and in vain tried to find a competent pilot who knew the waters up to Lisbon.

Emo set sail westward in mid-October. Contrary winds delayed the voyage near Malaga, before the Venetians were able to cross the Strait of Gibraltar and make for Lisbon. Unfortunately for Emo, his pilot mistook Cape da Roca for Cape Espichel, and almost wrecked the San Carlo by drawing near the shore. Emo realized the mistake and tried to correct course, but the heavy wind made the manoeuvre difficult. Emo had to reduce sail, and had to go through three sets of sails as they were ripped apart by the wind. San Carlo managed to clear the Berlengas islands, but the other two vessels were left behind in the process. After two days of struggle with the wind, Emo anchored at the mouth of the Mondego River, but almost immediately the ship lost its tiller. A new tiller was laboriously installed, but it broke apart during the night, followed soon after by the entire rudder. Some of his officers panicked and suggested beaching the ship, but Emo managed to restore discipline. He made contact with the shore, and with the help of the British vice-consul at Figueira arranged for Portuguese ships to two the San Carlo to Lisbon.

At Cape da Roca, a hard easterly wind forced the towing vessels to abandon the effort. The San Carlo was left to drift rudderless for several days, while the crew tried to jury-rig a new rudder. The Costanza, also heavily damaged and leaking water, was sighted and the two ships remained in contact for a day, before they drifted apart again. Water supplies on board the San Carlo ran low. A makeshift rudder was installed, which allowed the ship to once again reach the Cape da Roca, before yet another violent wind came from the south and drove the San Carlo to the north. The new rudder had to be cut free, and only with great difficulty, by sailing stern first, did the crew narrowly avoid a shipwreck at the Berlengas.

The crew by this time had been reduced by accident, illness and fatigue from 590 to some 130 men, and more were lost to accidents. Although the ship suffered damage to its masts and rigging, it managed to reach a spot further north of its original anchorage at the mouth of the Mondego. This time, Emo went ashore in person and obtained the help of the local Portuguese governor. It took 17 days for a new rudder to be constructed, and five more for it to be installed on the ship, whose effective crew was down to 70, most of whom were inexperienced and exhausted soldiers. Accidents continued while Emo tried out his repaired ship, but at long last he was able to turn it south to Lisbon, entering the Tagus River on 5 February 1759. There he found his other two ships: the San Vicenzo had got in on 8 December, and the Costanza on 22 December.

At Lisbon, where Emo's struggle with the elements and misfortune had been followed with great interest, he was received by King Joseph I with the honours due to an ambassador. Taking charge of the Venetian merchant ships from London, he returned home via Genoa and Naples with little incident, reaching Corfu in mid-July 1759. Over the course of the voyage, San Carlo had no fewer than 250 dead, while San Vicenzo suffered 90 dead and Costanza 4. 76 more crewmen (from an original total of 1236) deserted. Emo's conduct during the voyage gave proof of his seamanship and command skills, earning universal acclaim on his return to Venice in August 1759.

Rise to high command and state offices

Following Venetian tradition, a military appointment was followed by a civilian one. As  (water commissioner) in 1761–62, he commissioned a plan of the Venetian Lagoon, which was completed in six months. So accurate was this plan that it continued in use until well into the 19th century.

Show of force at Algiers
In 1767 the Dey of Algiers tried to extort an increase in the annual sums sent to safeguard Venetian shipping from pirate attacks, and took Venetian ships and their crews captive. Emo sailed to Algiers and threatened to bombard the city. The Dey released the ships and their crews, paid reparations, and renewed the treaty with Venice to its previous terms.

The Republic honoured Emo with appointment to the exclusive Order of the Golden Stole, and sent Emo's brother, Luigi, to convey him the Order's insignia.

Russo-Turkish War
When the Russian fleet under Alexei Orlov arrived in the Mediterranean in 1770 as part of the Russo-Turkish War of 1768–1774, Emo led a Venetian squadron to a cruise in the Aegean, to shadow the Russians, and protect Venetian and French subjects and commercial interests in the area. Emo fulfilled his instructions in exemplary fashion, providing constant updates on Russian operations and making sound judgments on their intentions. The conflict also saw raids by the pirates of Ulcinj, ostensibly acting as subjects of the Sultan, against the Venetian Ionian Islands. Emo pursued them at Kythira (Cerigo) and recovered two captured ships.

Emo's fleet suffered heavy losses when it was caught by a storm near Cape Matapan on 19 December 1771: half his squadron, the 74-gun ship Corriera and the frigate Tolleranza, foundered off Elos, the former with almost all hands. Emo's own flagship, the Ercole, only survived by cutting her masts. Emo himself was swept to sea during the manoeuvre and was rescued with difficulty by his crew. Distraught over what he perceived as a personal failure, Emo offered to donate his fortune to make up for the losses.
 
In 1772 he departed his naval duties and entered the Venetian Senate, as well as going abroad, visiting the courts of Frederick II of Prussia and Maria Theresa of Austria. Elected several times as censor, he worked to revive the manufacture of Murano glass.

In 1775, Emo was a member of a commission to examine reforms for the Venetian navy. Although the parlous state of the Venetian navy was well known and had been a subject of debate and reform proposals for decades, nothing had been achieved. The new commission's report—authored by Emo—recommended reforms on the model of the British Royal Navy, but although the commission numbered some influential senators, again its proposals failed to be taken up.

Demonstration off Tripoli
On 18 July 1778 Emo again received a naval command, being elected , with the heavy frigate  as his flagship. His mission was to confront the provocations of the Pashalik of Tripolitania, which tried to exploit the "right of search" accorded to them by treaty on Venetian shipping beyond the agreed-upon limits. Emo led his fleet in a demonstration of force in front of Tripoli, leading the pasha to conclude a new peace agreement with the Republic. Emo's appointment was renewed for the year after, but in the event it was not required for him to set sail.

However, once again due to lack of funds, the plans were not carried out.

Director of the Arsenal and naval reforms

During the January 1782 visit of the Grand Duke Paul (the future Tsar Paul I of Russia) to Venice, he personally introduced Paul into the details of the Venetian naval apparatus. When Venice resolved to send a permanent envoy to Saint Petersburg shortly after, Emo's name was on top of the list, but he managed to avoid the appointment by pleading ill health.

Instead, in 1782–1784 Emo served as one of the three directors of the Venetian Arsenal. Assisted by the reformist senator Francesco Pesaro,  during his tenure he restored and reformed this vital institution, that had fallen into decline. He imported new models of ships from England and France, introduced copper sheathing of warships to improve their speed and reduce the maintenance costs, and improved the methods for the manufacture of hawsers and rigging. He also increased the salaries of non-noble officers, introduced a theoretical training for naval cadets, as well as a publicly funded welfare scheme for invalid and aged sailors. Using his own position as a senator, and later as a member of the central government, the Signoria of Venice, Emo secured funds for the construction of new warships: 15 were laid down after his tenure and until the end of the Republic.

In 1783 Emo led the negotiations with the Habsburg envoy Philipp von Cobenzl on freedom of navigation in Istria and Dalmatia.

Naval campaigns against Tunis

On 21 June, Emo sailed from Venice for a slow voyage to Corfu, where he was joined by more ships. The fleet sailed for Tunis on 12 August.

On 1 September 1784, his squadron anchored at Cape Carthage, five miles from the city of Tunis. The Tunisian fleet, geared towards piracy against merchantmen, did not sail to oppose the Venetians, who were able to infiltrate the harbour of La Goulette during the night of the 3rd/4th and retake a Neapolitan merchant ship just captured by the pirates. After replenishing water and supplies in Sardinia, Emo sailed for Sousse, which he bombarded on 5–7 and 12 October 1784, before the autumn storms forced him to return to winter in Trapani in Sicily and Malta.

In April 1785, Emo returned to Tunis, but as the Bey of Tunis refused to negotiate, forcing Emo to return to Malta and Sicily. The Venetian fleet again bombarded Sousse intermittently (21 July, 27 July and 31 July—4 August) due to the bad weather, but with meagre results. Sfax followed (15–17 August 1785), before the fleet retired to Trapani again. After receiving reinforcements from Venice that raised his fleet to five first-rate ships of the line, one light frigate, two xebecs, one galiot, and the two bomb-vessels, Emo returned to La Goulette. It was here that Emo employed floating batteries of his own invention: large floats made of empty barrels, fortified with wet sandbags, and equipped with 40-pound guns and mortars. Along with the bomb-vessels, this gave the Venetians the ability to hit the settlements behind the sea walls during the nights of 3, 5, and 10 October.  As the Bey remained obdurate, Emo dismantled his rafts and returned to Trapani.

As the Bey continued to insist on his previous demands, Emo returned to the Tunisian coast in early 1786, attacking Sfax (and 6, 18, and 22 March, 30 April and 4 May). The Tunisians had prepared for his arrival, repairing their walls and installing heavy guns, leading to intense artillery duels between the city and the fleet. Emo too had appreciated the effect of his floating batteries, and had built more of them, with still heavier mortars; in daring nightly operations they were led up to the sea walls, and bombarded the city's interior with such devastating effects that the inhabitants of Sfax pleaded with the Bey to resume negotiations, to little effect.  The Venetian fleet retired to Malta, where the news that Emo had been elected Procurator of Saint Mark on 28 May reached the fleet, an event that was celebrated for three days and nights. With the Bey still refusing to negotiate, Emo attacked Bizerte from 30 July to 10 August, and then, from 26 September to 6 October, Sousse, which now was left almost entirely in ruins. 

These operations not only caused great damage and casualties in these cities, but also confined the Tunisian pirate fleet to its harbours. They also made Emo famous throughout Europe, where the images of his firework-like night bombardments kindled the imagination. Nevertheless, they failed to achieve their principal objective, namely to force the Bey of Tunis to the negotiating table. Venice, like the other European naval powers, preferred to reach an agreement with the pirates, including the annual payments, than engage in long, and far more expensive, campaigns that would be required to thoroughly deal with the pirate threat. Thus Emo's requests of a 10,000-man expeditionary force  with which to assault and capture Tunis, were rejected by the Venetian Senate.

Final years and death

In early 1787 the Senate recalled Emo with the bulk of his fleet, leaving only a small squadron under the  Tommaso Condulmer to patrol the Tunisian coast. Emo's recall was likely connected to the imminent outbreak of another war between Russia and the Ottomans. Some alarm was caused by an Ottoman fleet that appeared off the coasts of Albania in August 1787, but Emo, who shadowed its movements with a far more formidable force, was not worried. In the event, the Ottoman fleet's mission was merely to overawe the rebellious Pasha of Scutari; having accomplished that, it returned to its base in early 1788. Until 1791, Emo spent his time in anti-piracy cruises off the western coasts of Greece, with the exception of a foray into the Aegean in 1790 that brought him to Paros.

In late 1790, the Senate named Emo , but did not entrust him with leading the fleet against the Tunisian coast. With the French Revolution under way in Europe, the Senate was loath to become embroiled in a prolonged conflict, and preferred peace. In 1791, the Venetian government decided on a final show of force, reuniting the fleet of Emo with the squadron of Condulmer. The combined fleet demonstrated off the Tunisian coast from late August until returning to Malta in December. After an illness, Emo died in Malta on 1 March 1792, reportedly from a bilious attack after learning that a peace, mostly disadvantageous to Venice, had been concluded with Tunis without his being consulted.

Celebrated as a great naval hero, his body was embalmed and carried to Venice on board his flagship, Fama. The sculptor Antonio Canova was charged with erecting a monument to Emo. Completed in 1794, it is in the second armoury of the Venetian Arsenal. Canova was honoured by the Republic with a medal for this monument, the last such medal issued by the Republic before its end. His funeral took place at St Mark's on 17 April, and he was buried at the church of Santa Maria dei Servi. A funerary monument was erected over his tomb by Canova's teacher, Giovanni Ferrari, initially at Santa Maria dei Servi, then moved to San Martino, and finally, from 1817, to San Biagio.

Legacy
Following the death of his older brother, Alviso Emo, in 1790, Angelo Emo's death also meant the end of the San Simeon Piccolo branch of the Emo family.

Already at the time of his death, his loss was seen as a heavy blow and symptom of the Republic's decline. Emo's reputation was enhanced further by 19th-century historians of Venice, keen on romanticizing the final decades of the Republic: Girolamo Dandolo calls him "the last roar issued by the Lion of St. Mark on the sea", while for Samuele Romanin he might have been able to "shake [the Republic] from the disastrous abandonment" and "inspire in her the strength and energy" that she sorely lacked in the final years of its existence. For Romanin, Emo was the last of the great captains of the Venetian navy, and indeed of the Republic, which "may indeed be said to have herself descended with him into the sepulchre". After him, the Venetian navy would no longer be called upon to fight.

His sudden death also led to rumours that he had been poisoned. Girolamo Dandolo insisted that this was the case, and identified his deputy Tommaso Condulmer, ambitious not only to succeed him, but also to conclude a peace treaty with the Barbary states. This has been convincingly disproved by modern historians.

References

Bibliography

Further reading
 

1731 births
1792 deaths
18th-century Venetian people
Republic of Venice admirals
Barbary pirates
People involved in anti-piracy efforts
Procurators of Saint Mark
Ottoman Tunisia